Tom Swift and His Electric Runabout, or, The Speediest Car on the Road, is Volume 5 in the original Tom Swift novel series published by Grosset & Dunlap.

Plot summary 

Tom Swift enters an upcoming race with his specially-designed prototype electric race car. But as he makes the final preparations and adjustments, days before the race, he discovers a plot that would bankrupt not only his family, but also everyone else that relies on the local bank (which is the target of a nefarious bank run scheme). Tom must solve the mystery and stop the criminals behind the plot before he will test himself on a 500-mile race against some of the best cars and skilled drivers in the United States.

Inventions & innovation 

Tom Swift invents a groundbreaking, powerful new rechargeable battery with half the recharge time (allowing Tom to leave other battery-powered race cars far behind while at the track).

More importantly, Tom has taken electric vehicles to a whole new level with his convertible sports car, both with the inclusion of his revolutionary battery, but in other wonderful design features as well. His custom vehicle was designed from the ground up for performance and speed, with a top rate of 100 mph and a range of 400 miles (on a single charge). Over 100 years later, electric cars can finally exceed what Tom designed in his spare time. His aerodynamic convertible was painted a glossy purple that was sure not to be overlooked when barreling down the speedway.

External links
 Tom Swift and his Electric Runabout e-text at Project Gutenberg
 

1910 American novels
Tom Swift
American young adult novels